For the Muslims of Greek ethnic origin, see Greek Muslims
For the multiethnic Muslim minority in Thrace in Greece, see Muslim minority (Greece)
See also: Islam in Greece